2006 Belarusian First League was the sixteenth season of 2nd level football championship in Belarus. It started in April and ended in October 2006.

Team changes from 2005 season
Two best teams of the last season (Belshina Bobruisk and Lokomotiv Vitebsk) were promoted to Belarusian Premier League. They were replaced by two teams that finished at the bottom of 2005 Belarusian Premier League table (Zvezda-BGU Minsk and Slavia Mozyr).

Two lowest placed teams of 2005 season (Orsha and Dnepr-DUSSh-1 Rogachev) relegated to the Second League. They were replaced by two best teams of 2005 Second League (Torpedo-SKA Minsk and Pinsk-900).

Before the start of the season Smena Minsk was transformed into new club FC Minsk, which overtook Smena's First League allocation, bypassing the Second League. Newly promoted Torpedo-SKA Minsk was disbanded with some of its facilities being inherited by Minsk.

Slavia Mozyr and ZLiN Gomel merged into Mozyr-ZLiN, a club became a successor of Slavia Mozyr (and was eventually renamed into such).

Torpedo-Kadino Mogilev withdrew from the league and disbanded due to lack of financing. They were replaced by additionally promoted Polotsk, who finished 5th in last year's Second League. Two teams that finished above Polotsk and were also eligible for additional promotion (Spartak Shklov and Vertikal Kalinkovichi) refused the invitation due to insufficient financing. No other teams were promoted and the league was reduced from 16 to 14 clubs.

Granit Mikashevichi changed their name to FC Mikashevichi and Pinsk-900 to Volna Pinsk prior to the season.

Teams and locations

League table

Top goalscorers

See also
2006 Belarusian Premier League
2005–06 Belarusian Cup
2006–07 Belarusian Cup

External links
RSSSF

Belarusian First League seasons
2
Belarus
Belarus